The 2023 Stanford Cardinal football team will represent Stanford University as a member of the Pac-12 Conference during the 2023 NCAA Division I FBS football season. The Cardinal is expected to be led by Troy Taylor in his first season as Stanford's head coach. Taylor was hired in December 2022. The team plays its home games at Stanford Stadium in Stanford, California.

Schedule

References

Stanford
Stanford Cardinal football seasons
Stanford football